Billy (commonly known as Jigsaw or combined name Billy Jigsaw) is a puppet that has appeared in the Saw franchise. It was used by John "Jigsaw" Kramer to communicate with his test subjects by delivering recorded messages, often appearing on a television screen, or occasionally in person, to describe the details of the traps and the means by which the test subjects could survive.

In the film series, before becoming the Jigsaw Killer, John created a puppet similar to Billy to be given as a toy to his unborn child. However, Jill Tuck, his wife, is shown to miscarry after being hit in the stomach by a swinging hospital door due to Cecil ramming it open without looking. John's unresolved anger was likely a primary motive for using a more sinister version of the puppet to convey his instructions to victims of his traps. The traps he created can be seen as a manifestation of his anger with people who he feels do not appreciate having their life, when his unborn baby was killed before having a life of its own.

Although never actually identified in the films, "Billy" is the name by which writers, directors, and members of the cast and crew refer to it in documentaries and interviews. The name was given to it by Australian creator James Wan, who is the director and co-writer of Saw. Some claim that the name is spelled "Billie", though Wan himself spells it "Billy".

The endurance and popularity of the Saw franchise has resulted in the production of Billy merchandise, as well as references in other media.

Characteristics
Billy is a male ventriloquist's dummy, as his jaw is movable to give the suggestion that it is talking; however, it is not used in the same manner, as the entire doll is frequently seen moving on its own. Its face is white, with a protruding brow and cheeks that have red spirals painted on them. Its red lips form a grin. Its eyes are black with red irises, and its head is topped with black hair.

Billy is always depicted wearing a black tuxedo with a white shirt and gloves, red bow tie, and red handkerchief in the breast pocket. It also has red Mary Janes for shoes. In the short film, it is seen wearing a green bowler hat. It is often riding an old fashioned red tricycle. The only sound originating directly from him is an electronic cackle.

Construction
According to Wan, the construction of the original puppet's face for Saw involved clay, papier-mâché, and black ping pong balls with the irises painted in for the eyes. Paper towel rolls were used internally. To make him move, the puppeteers pulled him along on a fishing line.

For Saw II, Billy was redesigned with mechanical features that could be manipulated by a remote control, including his unhinged jaw and his eyes.

For Saw III, the prop crew was given the original puppet, but found it unfit for work, as time had damaged it. Instead, they recreated Billy, using waterjet-cut foam for his body instead of fiberglass, equipped with plates to hold the puppet together and magnets to attach him to his tricycle. The back of his head was removable, to make it easier to slide animatronic pieces in.

For Saw IV, the prop crew made the body of waterjet-cut foam, held together by metal rods. They used strong magnets to make a flat rear surface for the puppet so it could be easily positioned on any metal surface. The mouth and resin-filled ping-pong ball eyes were moved by remote control.

Appearances in films

Saw

In the first Saw film, Billy is seen on a television set by Amanda Young, telling her about the reverse bear trap that was hooked into her jaws, and explaining that the key to remove it is in the stomach of her "dead cellmate" (who is actually a heavily sedated man) lying in the room. After she disembowels the man and frees herself, Billy comes into the room on his tricycle to congratulate her.

Later, Adam Stanheight remembers seeing the puppet in his apartment when the lights went out. As he searches the dark rooms using his camera's flash, the puppet's eerie laugh rings through the apartment, and Adam hits it with a bat until it stops.

When Detectives David Tapp and Steven Sing discover Jigsaw's latest hideout, they remove blankets from several covered items, one of which is Billy.

Saw II

In Saw II, Billy is seen on the screen at the beginning of the film, giving Michael Marks hints about the death mask he is wearing.

Later, when the detectives discover Jigsaw's new hideout, several officers walk up a caged staircase and are greeted by Billy, who wheels into sight at the top of the stairs on his tricycle and laughs. The cage then becomes electrified after one officer steps on a rigged step that breaks his legs.

Saw III

In a flashback in Saw III, Jigsaw is seen constructing Billy for Amanda's game, painting the puppet's face. Later, Billy appears on videotape to inform Troy and Detective Allison Kerry of their respective traps.

Billy is also used to remind Jeff Denlon of his dead son, by appearing next to his tricycle in the same position Jeff's son was in when he was killed. The puppet gives a mocking laugh until Jeff beats it into silence.

Saw IV

Billy is first seen in Saw IV when Officer Daniel Rigg awakes after being attacked in his apartment and rendered unconscious. Rigg opens his bathroom door, pulling a trigger wire from a TV set. Billy appears on the screen to explain Rigg's game. Upon leaving the room, Rigg is greeted by another message concerning his first test, referring to a woman Jigsaw deemed to be a criminal, who had been placed in a machine that would scalp her.

Agents Peter Strahm and Lindsey Perez later find Billy in a room in a school, sitting on a chair surrounded by candles. From a microcassette recorder hung around the puppet's neck, Perez learns that her partner will soon take the life of an innocent man (later revealed to be Jeff Denlon), and that her next move is critical. Billy's eyes begin turning to Perez. She leans in to hear this last, at which point Billy's face explodes, blowing shrapnel into her face and neck. Perez collapses into Strahm's arms as Billy laughs.

There is also a flashback of Jigsaw giving a less menacing, early version of Billy to Jill Tuck as a gift for their unborn son Gideon. An interview with Tobin Bell revealed that this was the beginning of a storyline concerning Billy's origins, as that of his tricycle, to be explored in future Saw films.

Saw V

Billy appears in the opening sequence to tell Seth Baxter the rules of his game. It is unknown how Mark Hoffman created the videotape for this game. According to a list of potential Jigsaw victims, Seth was the third person tested after Cecil and Mark Wilson. In those tests, Jigsaw did not use a puppet. However, Jigsaw's testing spree had already begun beforehand, as shown during the events of Jigsaw, where Billy does appear.

Billy is also seen at the beginning of the tests designed for Ashley, Luba Gibbs, Charles, Brit, and Mallick.

Saw VI

In Saw VI, Billy appears on tape in the opening trap, which pits Simone and Eddie against each other. He also addresses William Easton during two of his four tests. He appears in William's second test hanging from a noose, and on videotape in the fourth test. Saw VI marks the first time Billy appears "in person" to deliver test details to victims.

Saw 3D

Billy appears in Saw 3D. He gives Brad and Ryan instructions for their trap in person (and is covered in Dina's blood when she is killed by the trap), does the same for Bobby Dagen's second test, and appears on videotape for the others. When Hoffman goes to his hideout after killing Jill Tuck with the reverse bear trap, multiple Billy heads can be seen. Billy's final appearance is in Hoffman's secret hideout at the end of the film; Hoffman blows it up, destroying Billy in the explosion.

Jigsaw

Billy appears in Jigsaw. This time, he has illuminated eyes. He appears on his tricycle with a letter around his neck with the word "Confess" written on it. He later appears on a videotape with his eyes illuminated, explaining to Ryan how he can save Anna and Mitch before they are buried alive in grain.

Spiral

A photograph of Billy is seen in Spiral, while the film's Jigsaw copycat killer and main antagonist, Billy Emmerson (portrayed by Max Minghella as an adult and Leonidas Castrounis as a child) is named in tribute to the puppet. Masquerading as police detective "William Schenk", Emmerson showcases his own new puppet inspired by both Billy and the pig motif of the previous films.

Non-canonical film appearances

Saw 0.5

In this short film, Billy is seen on a television set by David, telling him about the reverse bear trap that was hooked into his jaws, and explaining that the key to remove it is in the stomach of his "dead cellmate" (who is actually a heavily sedated man) lying in the room. After he disembowels the man and frees himself, Billy comes into the room on his tricycle to congratulate him.

Dead Silence

In the 2007 film Dead Silence, one of the puppets, who appears on the film's poster and wears the same outfit as Jigsaw's puppet, is named Billy.

Death Sentence

A graffiti-style painting of Billy's face can be seen on a wall in James Wan's film Death Sentence.

Insidious

In the 2011 film Insidious there is a scene in which Josh (the father) is working late in the classroom and Billy is drawn in chalk on the blackboard behind his head. Underneath the drawing the number eight is shown, hinting at Jigsaw.

Scary Movie 4

Billy the Puppet appears in the film as the main antagonist.

Upgrade

A graffiti-style painting of Billy's face can be seen on a wall in Leigh Whannell's film Upgrade.

The Invisible Man

A graffiti-style painting of Billy's face can be seen on a fence in Leigh Whannell's film The Invisible Man.

Other media

Comic
Billy can be seen in the corners of two panels near the beginning of Saw: Rebirth, foreshadowing John Kramer's eventual transformation into Jigsaw. The comic also marks Billy as one of John's creations at the toy factory where he worked, but this backstory was negated in Saw IV.

Dancing with the Stars
On season 30 of Dancing with the Stars, the Halloween/horror-themed episode featured Amanda Kloots performing while costumed as Billy. The show, however mis-identified the character being portrayed as "Jigsaw".

Video games
Billy, voiced by Tobin Bell, appears throughout Saw: The Video Game, delivering hints and objectives to the player. He also featured prominently in marketing for the game. In the "Freedom" ending, Billy's reflection is seen on a TV when Tapp commits suicide.

He returns in Saw II: Flesh & Blood, the sequel to the first game, also voiced by Tobin Bell. Billy repeats his role as in the first game, giving hints and clues to the player. The player can also collect small Billy dolls throughout the game, which require solving more complicated puzzles to obtain them; they are off of the main path, so the player does not have to get them. Saw II: Flesh & Blood is also the only time in the Saw franchise that he is actually called "Billy".

Rocket League
Billy the Puppet is featured on some cosmetic items, such as a car decal, in the popular free-to-play online game Rocket League from 19 October 2022 as part of the Halloween update titled "Haunted Hallows".

Dead by Daylight
Billy is in the video game Dead by Daylight as a prop as part of the Saw chapter. He appears sitting on the character-specific prop boxes that appear in maps when the player chooses "The Pig", a licensed character from Saw (who is Amanda Young in her Jigsaw apprentice reliefs).

Call of Duty: Modern Warfare
A costume of Billy was added to Call of Duty: Modern Warfare for Warzone operator Morte as a part of The Haunting of Verdansk event.

Call of Duty: Mobile
A costume of Billy was added to Call of Duty: Mobile for operator Morte as a part of Season 9 Nightmare.

Amusement park appearances
Saw – The Ride

Billy appears on numerous screens throughout the queue line of "Saw – The Ride" at Thorpe Park, England, telling riders that they are not worthy of the life they have been given, implicating the ride to be one of Jigsaw's traps. He also appears on his tricycle at the start of the ride itself; the second dispatched car (two cars are dispatched one after the other) will stop while Billy gives a speech, informing the riders that there is no escape, and proclaiming, "Here's what happens when you lose", before allowing the train to pass – this regulates the distance between cars. He can also be seen before the car travels up the lift hill, appearing on a screen and saying "Game over", and at the end of the ride, where his head can be seen on a shelf covered with body parts.

Saw Alive

The former "Saw Alive" maze, also in Thorpe Park, allowed parkgoers to be photographed with Billy.

Saw: Game Over

In the U.S., Billy appears several times in the maze "Saw: Game Over" at Orlando Horror Nights at Universal Studios Florida.

In popular culture
 A line of replica "Billy" dolls has been released for consumer purchase, mainly through gift stores. It retains the main characteristics of the doll, though is much cleaner in appearance. Billy Halloween masks and costumes have also been released for purchase.
 In The Office'''s episode "Koi Pond", Dwight Schrute dressed up as Billy for Halloween.
 On a webisode of The Hardy Show, Matt Hardy dressed up as Billy for Halloween.
 In the Halloween episode of The Cleveland Show, Rallo dresses up as Billy and introduces the episode.
 Before the releases of Saw III and Saw IV, Billy was used in videos to promote the films on YouTube and MySpace.
 In the Internet series Annoying Orange, Billy appears in "Annoying Saw" and "Annoying Saw 2: The Annoying Death Trap", both in which Orange refers to him as "Clownface", "Emo Clown", and "Donald Trump".
 Billy appears in a Dutch parody of The Little House on the Prairie from "De TV kantine". Nellie needs to cut off her arm or else she will see a man naked again which is seen earlier in the episode.
 A parody of Billy, called Jigzaw, appears in episodes 148–149 of the anime Gin Tama. In appearance he looks similar to Billy, with a white and red mask and is also dressed in a black tuxedo. He sports many of Billy's qualities, like appearing on a TV screen, trapping two characters in a familiar "game" and pitting them against each other.
 In the Aqua Teen Hunger Force episode "The Marines", Frylock is captured by a puppet parodying Billy who demands him to shove a grapefruit spoon in his eye.
 Singer Nicki Minaj used a Billy mask as the face of "Nemesis" during her setlist while on the Britney Spears Femme Fatale Tour in 2011.
 In the internet videogame series Inkagames, appear a character based on Billy called "Pigsaw", who is a recurring villain from the games.
 Rapper Hopsin's album Raw depicts Hopsin on a tricycle with his face painted to look like Billy. The album's title itself can be interpreted as a spoof of the film's title.
 Experimental pop artist Eric Millikin created a large mosaic portrait of Billy out of Halloween candy and spiders as part of his "Totally Sweet" series in 2013.
 In the Glee episode "The Hurt Locker, Part Two", Sue Sylvester uses a puppet resembling herself and Billy to communicate with Kurt and Blaine.
 In the webcomic Homestuck, Billy appears as one of the many puppets in Dave Strider's apartment. The character Caliborn also shares similarities with Billy.
 In an episode of The Fairly OddParents, Vicky dresses up as Billy the puppet to torture Timmy and Chloe.
 In  an episode of The Simpsons, Bart takes his adopted brother to see a horror film with Billy the Puppet on screen stabbing someone with a chef knife.
 In the sixth episode of the anime adaptation of Library War, Billy the Puppet appears in a horror movie watched by one of the characters.
 In the Speechless'' episode titled N-I-- NIGHTMARE ON D-I-- DIMEO STREET, Kenneth dresses as Billy the Puppet and communicates with the Dimeo's through a TV set

References

External links

 Dwight Schrute (portrayed by Rainn Wilson) dressed as Billy
 Example of Billy Halloween mask

Saw (franchise) characters
Film characters introduced in 2003
Horror film villains
Fictional puppets
Male characters in film
Male characters in advertising
Mascots introduced in 2003